Merklín is a municipality and village in Plzeň-South District in the Plzeň Region of the Czech Republic. It has about 1,200 inhabitants.

Administrative parts
Villages of Kloušov and Lhota are administrative parts of Merklín.

Gallery

References

Villages in Plzeň-South District